Onkkaala (formerly known as the Pälkäne church village) is a village and the administrative center of the Pälkäne municipality in Pirkanmaa, Finland. At the end of 2020, the village had 2,569 inhabitants. Onkkaala is located on the isthmus between Lake Pälkänevesi and Lake Mallasvesi, through which the Kostianvirta River, which connects the lakes, flows. Highway 12 between cities of Tampere and Lahti passes through Onkkaala.

Many services in Pälkäne are located in Onkkaala, such as the municipal office, health center, bus station, library, primary school, high school, fire station, church and parish center. Commercial services include the delivery of Sydän-Hämeen Lehti newspaper. Onkkaala has a beach sauna for rent on the shores of Lake Mallasvesi as well as a historical cultural route.

The name of Onkkaala (as Oncala) is first mentioned in documents from 1340, when 25 peasants of the then Sääksmäki parish were excommunicated after they failed to pay their taxes. One of the excommunicated peasants was mentioned as Ye de Oncala, which can be interpreted as "Yijä of Onkkaala".

See also
 Aitoo

Sources

Further reading
 Pälkäneen historia, p. 703. Pälkäneen kunta, 1972. ISBN 951-95045-0-8. (in Finnish)
 Pälkäneen historia II, p. 738. Pälkäneen kunta, 1988. ISBN 951-99956-0-9. (in Finnish)

References

External links
 Onkkaala's location at Fonecta

Pälkäne
Villages in Finland